Sri Ranganatha Swamy Temple is a Hindu temple located in Vavilavalasa, Rajam, Srikakulam district of Andhra Pradesh.  The main ideal is Salagramam, taken from Srirangam, Tamil Nadu.

Sri Ranganathaswamy Temple was constructed by Inuganty kings 150 years ago, according to the sources and records temple built by Sri Rajha Inuganty Sitarama Rayanam garu or Rajha Inuganty Jaggarayanam garu.
Only the finance resource is hereditary Dhramkatrutva mandali of Inuganty family and Devotees of Lord Sri Ranganatha Swamy.
The present Temple Dhrmakartha is Sri Inganty Andalamma garu.

Hindu temples in Srikakulam district
Uttarandhra